The 1998 NBA playoffs was the postseason tournament of the National Basketball Association's 1997–98 season. The tournament concluded with the two-time defending NBA champion and Eastern Conference champion Chicago Bulls defeating the Western Conference champion Utah Jazz 4 games to 2 in the NBA Finals. The Bulls also achieved a second three peat, a goal unrivaled since the Boston Celtics in 1966. Michael Jordan was named NBA Finals MVP for the sixth and final time.

Overview
The Indiana Pacers entered the postseason with a franchise record 58 wins. Although they would lose to the Chicago Bulls in the Eastern Conference Finals, this team was later named by Pacers.com as the greatest in franchise history, even better than the 2000 team that won the Eastern Conference Title, primarily due to their record.

The New Jersey Nets made the playoffs for the first time since 1994, but did not appear again until 2002. Their presence was a mere asterisk compared to what they accomplished in 2002, getting swept by the eventual champion Bulls.

The Minnesota Timberwolves won their first playoff game in franchise history by winning Game 2 of their series against the Seattle SuperSonics. However, the SuperSonics prevailed in five games despite the Timberwolves taking a 2-1 series lead. 

The Cleveland Cavaliers lost to Indiana in the first round 3–1 and did not appear again until 2006.

The Heat-Knicks series was extremely notable for two reasons
 Game 4: A fight broke out between Larry Johnson and Alonzo Mourning at the end of the game (in which the Knicks won 90-85). A lasting image of the fight was Knicks coach Jeff Van Gundy clinging to Mourning’s leg. Both players were suspended for two games. Johnson and Mourning had bad blood dating back to their stint as Charlotte Hornets teammates.
 Game 5: The New York Knicks became the fourth seventh seed to knock off a second seeded team in the first round of the playoffs. This would not occur again until 2010.

Game 5 of the Jazz-Rockets series would be the final game of Clyde Drexler's career.

The Los Angeles Lakers advanced to the Western Conference Finals for the first time since 1991. They were ultimately swept by the Jazz.

The Eastern Conference Finals series between the Chicago Bulls and Indiana Pacers was extremely notable for several reasons
 Game 4: Reggie Miller’s game winning 3 pointer with 0.7 seconds, which has been marked one of the greatest postseason moments in NBA History. Michael Jordan attempted a game winning 3 pointer of his own, but it rimmed out, effectively tying the series at 2-2.
 Game 6 of the Eastern Conference Finals: With a win, the Pacers took the Bulls to the limit by becoming 1 of only 2 teams to force a Game 7 in the Bulls' title years (the Knicks achieved this in 1992).
 Game 7: This was the first Game 7 to take place at the United Center.
 Game 7: This was the last Game 7 the Bulls would play until 2013.

For the first time since 1989 NBA Finals, there was a rematch of the same two teams: the Chicago Bulls and the Utah Jazz. This would not happen again until 2014.

Game 6 of the NBA Finals was extremely notable for several reasons
 In the waning moments of the game Michael Jordan made the title winning shot over Byron Russell. This moment was marked as one of the greatest moments in NBA playoff history.
 It was the highest rated and most watched game in NBA History, with 72 million viewers watching at least part of the game and an average of 35.9 million views.
 It was the last Chicago Bulls postseason game until 2005 and the last involving the Michael Jordan-led Bulls.
 Michael Jordan’s final NBA playoff game.
 Phil Jackson’s final game as coach of the Chicago Bulls (he would go on to coach the Los Angeles Lakers two seasons later).
 As of 2023, this remains the most recent NBA Finals game for the Chicago Bulls and the Utah Jazz.

Bracket
Teams in bold advanced to the next round. The numbers to the left of each team indicate the team's seeding in its conference, and the numbers to the right indicate the number of games the team won in that round. The division champions are marked by an asterisk. Teams with home court advantage are shown in Italics.

Playoff qualifying

Western Conference

Home court advantage

The Utah Jazz and Chicago Bulls tied for the best record in the NBA. However, Utah won the season series 2–0 and was awarded home court advantage throughout the playoffs.

Clinched a playoff berth
The following teams clinched a playoff berth in the West:

Utah Jazz (62-20, clinched Midwest division)
Seattle SuperSonics (61-21, clinched Pacific division)
Los Angeles Lakers (61-21)
Phoenix Suns (56-26)
San Antonio Spurs (56-26)
Portland Trail Blazers (46-36)
Minnesota Timberwolves (45-37)
Houston Rockets (41-41)

Eastern Conference

Best record in conference
The Chicago Bulls clinched the best record in the East, and earned home court advantage throughout the Eastern Conference playoffs.

Clinched a playoff berth
The following teams clinched a playoff berth in the East:

Chicago Bulls (62-20, clinched Central division)
Miami Heat (55-27, clinched Atlantic division)
Indiana Pacers (58-24)
Charlotte Hornets (51-31)
Atlanta Hawks (50-32)
Cleveland Cavaliers (47-35)
New York Knicks (43-39)
New Jersey Nets (43-39)

First round

Eastern Conference first round

(1) Chicago Bulls vs. (8) New Jersey Nets

This was the first playoff meeting between the Bulls and the Nets.

(2) Miami Heat vs. (7) New York Knicks

Alonzo Mourning and Larry Johnson fight.

This was the second playoff meeting between these two teams, with the Heat winning the first meeting.

(3) Indiana Pacers vs. (6) Cleveland Cavaliers

This was the first playoff meeting between the Cavaliers and the Pacers.

(4) Charlotte Hornets vs. (5) Atlanta Hawks

This was the first playoff meeting between the Hawks and the Hornets.

Western Conference first round

(1) Utah Jazz vs. (8) Houston Rockets

Game 5 is Clyde Drexler's final NBA game.

This was the fifth playoff meeting between these two teams, with each team winning two series apiece.

(2) Seattle SuperSonics vs. (7) Minnesota Timberwolves

This was the first playoff meeting between the Timberwolves and the SuperSonics.

(3) Los Angeles Lakers vs. (6) Portland Trail Blazers

This was the eighth playoff meeting between these two teams, with the Lakers winning five of the first seven meetings.

(4) Phoenix Suns vs. (5) San Antonio Spurs

This was the fourth playoff meeting between these two teams, with the Suns winning two of the first three meetings.

Conference semifinals

Eastern Conference semifinals

(1) Chicago Bulls vs. (4) Charlotte Hornets

This was the second playoff meeting between these two teams, with the Bulls winning the first meeting.

(3) Indiana Pacers vs. (7) New York Knicks

Reggie Miller hits the game-tying 3 with 5.1 seconds left to force OT.

This was the fourth playoff meeting between these two teams, with the Knicks winning two of the first three meetings.

Western Conference semifinals

(1) Utah Jazz vs. (5) San Antonio Spurs

This was the third playoff meeting between these two teams, with the Jazz winning the first two meetings.

(2) Seattle SuperSonics vs. (3) Los Angeles Lakers

This was the seventh playoff meeting between these two teams, with the Lakers winning four of the first six meetings.

Conference finals

Eastern Conference finals

(1) Chicago Bulls vs. (3) Indiana Pacers

Reggie Miller hits the game-winning 3 with 7 tenths left.

This was the first playoff meeting between the Bulls and the Pacers.

Western Conference finals

(1) Utah Jazz vs. (3) Los Angeles Lakers

This was the third playoff meeting between these two teams, with each team winning one series apiece.

NBA Finals: (E1) Chicago Bulls vs. (W1) Utah Jazz

Luc Longley hits the game-tying shot with 14.3 seconds left to force OT.

Utah scores the fewest points in any playoff game in NBA history (54) and loses by the biggest margin in NBA Finals history (42).

Michael Jordan hits the game-winning shot with 5.2 seconds left, this was Jordan's final NBA game with the Bulls.

This was the second NBA Finals meeting between these two teams, with the Bulls winning the first meeting.

References

External links
Basketball – Reference.com's 1998 Playoffs section

National Basketball Association playoffs
Playoffs
Sports in Portland, Oregon

fi:NBA-kausi 1997–1998#Pudotuspelit